Minet may 
refer to:

People
Bernard Minet, French singer and actor
Pierre Minet, French poet
William Minet (1851-1933), British landowner and philanthropist

Places
Minet Country Park, London, UK
Minet el-Beida, a bay north of Latakia, Syria
 Minet el Hosn, an ancient city located in what is now Beirut

Other
Minet ed Dhalia point, an archaeological term relating to flint tools